This article presents a list of the historical events and publications of Australian literature during 1954.

Books 

 James Aldridge – Heroes of the Empty View
 Jon Cleary – The Climate of Courage
 Miles Franklin – Cockatoos : A Story of Youth and Exodists
 Catherine Gaskin – Sara Dane
 T. A. G. Hungerford – Sowers of the Wind : A Novel of the Occupation of Japan
 Eric Lambert
 The Five Bright Stars
 The Veterans
 Eve Langley – White Topee
 Kenneth Mackenzie – The Refuge
 Alan Moorehead – A Summer Night
 E. V. Timms – The Fury
 Arthur Upfield
 Death of a Lake
 Sinister Stones
 Judah Waten – The Unbending

Short stories 

 A. Bertram Chandler – "Shadow Before"
 David Martin – "Where a Man Belongs"
 John Morrison – "The Incense-Burner"
 Dal Stivens – "In the Depths"
 Judah Waten – "Well, What Do You Say to My Boy?"

Children's and Young Adult fiction

 Nan Chauncy – A Fortune for the Brave
 Joan Phipson – Six and Silver
 Norman B. Tindale & Harold Arthur Lindsay – The First Walkabout, illustrated by Madeleine Boyce

Poetry 

 Thea Astley – "Droving Man"
 Dorothy Auchterlonie – "The Tree"
 John Blight
 "The Anchor"
 "Death of a Whale"
 "Nor'-Easter"
 "Rope"
 The Two Suns Met : Poems
 Dorothea Dowling – Twenty-One Poems
 R. D. Fitzgerald
 "Beginnings"
 "Edge"
 Mary Gilmore – Fourteen Men : Verses
 A. D. Hope – "The Return of Persephone"
 Christopher Koch – "The Boy Who Dreamed the Country Night"
 James McAuley
 "An Art of Poetry"
 "New Guinea"
 "To the Holy Spirit"
 Kenneth Mackenzie – "An Old Inmate"
 David Rowbotham – "Mullabinda"
 Douglas Stewart – "Spider-Gums"
 Colin Thiele – "The Mushroomer"
 John Thompson – Thirty Poems
 Judith Wright
 "At Cooloolah"
 "Flying Fox on Barbed Wire"

Biography 

 Nevil Shute – Slide Rule : The Autobiography of an Engineer
 David Unaipon – My Life Story

Non-Fiction 

 Vance Palmer – The Legend of the Nineties

Awards and honours

Literary

Children's and Young Adult

Poetry

Births 

A list, ordered by date of birth (and, if the date is either unspecified or repeated, ordered alphabetically by surname) of births in 1954 of Australian literary figures, authors of written works or literature-related individuals follows, including year of death.

 12 January
 Brian Caswell, writer for children
 Lee Tulloch, novelist
 26 March – Dorothy Porter, poet (died 2008)
 21 May – Paul Collins, author and editor
 17 June – Kerry Greenwood, novelist
 5 July – Kevin Hart, poet
 20 September – James Moloney, writer for children
 
Unknown date
 Russell Blackford, novelist and critic
 Rory Harris, poet
 Andrew Lansdown, poet
 Shane McCauley, poet
 Rosemary Sorensen, journalist, editor and critic

Deaths 

A list, ordered by date of death (and, if the date is either unspecified or repeated, ordered alphabetically by surname) of deaths in 1954 of Australian literary figures, authors of written works or literature-related individuals follows, including year of birth.

 16 May — Jack McLaren, novelist (born 1884)
 19 September – Miles Franklin, novelist (born 1879)
 2 November – Malcolm Afford, playwright and novelist (born 1906)

See also 
 1954 in Australia
 1954 in literature
 1954 in poetry
 List of years in Australian literature
 List of years in literature

References

 
Australian literature by year
20th-century Australian literature
1954 in literature